The 2014 Buffalo Funds - NAIA Men’s Division I Basketball Tournament was held in March at Municipal Auditorium in Kansas City, Missouri. The 77th annual NAIA basketball tournament featured 32 teams playing in a single-elimination format.

2014 NAIA tournament awards
Most consecutive tournament appearances: 23rd, Georgetown (KY)
Most tournament appearances: 33rd, Georgetown (KY)

Bracket

 *denotes overtime

References

NAIA Men's Basketball Championship
Tournament
NAIA Division I men's basketball tournament
NAIA Division I men's basketball tournament
College basketball tournaments in Missouri
Basketball competitions in Kansas City, Missouri